Daniel Scally (born 20 December 1999) is a Scottish professional footballer.

Career
Scally began his youth career with St. Mirren, before joining Kilmarnock in 2017. He made a single appearance for Kilmarnock, appearing as a 56th–minute substitute in a Scottish Challenge Cup fixture against Berwick Rangers on 15 August 2017.

In 2019, Scally joined Scottish League Two side Albion Rovers. Following a season with Albion Rovers, he moved up to Scottish League One club Forfar Athletic. Again, after a single season, Scally moved again, joining Stirling Albion in August 2021.

On 26 January 2022, Scally moved to the United States, signing with USL League One club Northern Colorado Hailstorm ahead of their inaugural season. He made his debut for Northern Colorado on 16 April 2022, appearing as an 83rd–minute substitute during a 2–1 loss to Charlotte Independence. Following the 2022 season, Northern Colorado declined his contract option.

References

1999 births
Albion Rovers F.C. players
Footballers from Glasgow
Association football wingers
Expatriate soccer players in the United States
Forfar Athletic F.C. players
Kilmarnock F.C. players
Living people
Northern Colorado Hailstorm FC players
Scottish footballers
Scottish Professional Football League players
Scottish expatriate footballers
Scottish expatriate sportspeople in the United States
St Mirren F.C. players
Stirling Albion F.C. players
USL League One players